Biathlon has been contested at the Winter Paralympic Games since the Winter Games in 1988, in Innsbruck, Austria.

Summary
In the winter Paralympics where the sport was introduced, only athletes with physical impairments were allowed to compete. In the following Winter Paralympics in 1992, competitors expanded to include those with visual impairments.

Athletes are separated into 3 categories: sitting, standing and visually impaired, and they compete in 3 events: sprint, middle distance, long distance.

Events

Medal table 
 NPCs in italics no longer compete at the Winter Paralympics

As of 2022 Winter Paralympics

Nations

See also

Biathlon at the Winter Olympics

References

 
Sports at the Winter Paralympics
Paralympics